Joëlle Boutin (born October 2, 1979) is a Canadian politician, who was elected to the National Assembly of Quebec in a byelection on December 2, 2019. She represents the electoral district of Jean-Talon as a member of the Coalition Avenir Québec.

Electoral record

References

1979 births
Living people
French Quebecers
Coalition Avenir Québec MNAs
Politicians from Quebec City
Women MNAs in Quebec
21st-century Canadian politicians
21st-century Canadian women politicians